This is a list of judges in fiction. The list also includes real people portrayed as judges in works of fiction.

Fictional judges 

 Philip Banks (The Fresh Prince of Bel-Air)
 Morag Bellingham (Home and Away)
 The Brethren (John Grisham novel)
 Annabelle Collins (Brookside)
 Judge Conti (Desperate Housewives)
 Courthouse judges:
Judge Homer Conklin
Judge Wyatt E. Jackson
Judge Justine Parkes
Judge Myron Winkleman
 Judge Dee
 Judge Dredd judges:
 Judge Anderson
 Galen DeMarco
 Judge Dredd
 Chief Judge Fargo
 Jack Point
 Marshall Eriksen (How I Met Your Mother)
 Claude Frollo (The Hunchback of Notre-Dame)
 Myrtle Fu - Chief Justice of the Supreme Court of Earth (Futurama)
 Judge Fudge (Drawn Together)
 Arthur Galzethron (Lost)
 Gavel (Marvel comics)
 Law & Order judges:
 Elizabeth Donnelly
 Barry Moredock
 Jamie Ross (Law & Order)
 Judge Leah Gould (Star Trek: The Next Generation)
 Milton Hardcastle
 Doc Hudson (Cars)
 Joan Hunt (Body of Proof)
 Judge Hannah Lampert (All My Children)
 Living Tribunal (Marvel comics)
 Rhonda Pearlman (The Wire)
 Pei Xuan (Water Margin)
 Judge Rosetta Reide
 Judge Rummy (eponymous comic strip)
 Judge Monica Ryan (L.A. Law)
 Judge Roy Snyder (The Simpsons)
 Judge Harold T. Stone (Night Court)
 Theodoric of York, Medieval Barber (SNL skit)
 Judge Turpin (the musical Sweeney Todd)
 Judge Arthur Vandelay (Seinfeld)
 Vigilante (DC comics)
 Ling Woo (Ally McBeal)
 Gallerian Marlon (Evillious Chronicles)

Real people as judges in fiction 

 The Futurama film Into the Wild Green Yonder includes Paula Abdul, Samuel Alito, Björk, Snoop Dogg, Janeane Garofalo, Ruth Bader Ginsburg, Sandra Day O'Connor, Katey Sagal, Antonin Scalia's head, David Souter, John Paul Stevens, Clarence Thomas, and Abe Vigoda as Associate Justices of the Supreme Court of Earth.
 Judge Bao, a fictionalized version of Bao Zheng
 Judge Holden (Blood Meridian)

See also
Legal drama
Perry Mason (1957 TV series)#Cast and characters
Politics in Futurama
Supreme Court of the United States in fiction

References

Fictional judges
Judges
Lists of legal professionals
Judges